OUE Downtown or 6 Shenton Way, formerly DBS Building Towers  is a high-rise skyscraper complex at 6 Shenton Way in the central business district of Singapore. The former headquarters of DBS Bank was located in the complex. Overseas Union Enterprise (OUE) acquired the complex in 2010 and renamed it 'OUE Downtown'.

History 
The DBS Tower One was finished in 1975, together with a wave of brutalist-style buildings, that dominated the 1950s to 1970s period. It was designed by Architects Team 3. Firms involved in the development of the building included DBS Land Limited, Obayashi-Gumi, Ltd., Steen Consultants Private Limited, Liu Cheng Consulting Engineers, Davis Langdon & Seah Philippines Inc., and Mitsubishi Elevator and Escalator.

Acquisition by Overseas Union Enterprise 
The towers were sold to Overseas Union Enterprise (OUE) for S$870.5 million in 2010.

In July 2012, DBS moved out of the towers and into its new headquarters at Marina Bay Financial Centre (MBFC) Tower 3. Various 'core support functions' were relocated to a nine-storey building at Changi Business Park, near the Expo MRT station, in 2010.

OUE took the opportunity to upgrade the property saying the acquisition was in line with its strategic goal of maximizing investment opportunities from high-yield properties. The property was redeveloped for mixed commercial and residential development. This was in line with OUE's plan to reduce its exposure in the office portfolio and allow it to participate in the residential market, to help lower borrowings and enhance cash flow for the company.

OUE Downtown now consists of the Downtown Gallery shopping mall running the full length of the podium, Tower One contains residential accommodation operated by Oakwood Apartments and Tower Two remains as offices.  The Work Project provides co-working space in the Gallery.

Amenities and architecture 
DBS Tower One was the first anchor in the financial district of Shenton Way, and was the tallest building in Singapore when it was completed in 1975. It was designed to provide multiple facilities within a single building, and contains facilities like a conference hall, a small theatre and an exhibition centre within the podium.

DBS Tower One is one of the first commercial buildings to incorporate a covered walkway around the whole city block. A series of roof gardens, viewing galleries and outdoor areas provide views and facilities for the enjoyment of its tenants. The bank used to own the towers until it sold them to a Goldman Sachs real estate fund in late 2005 and leased back the space it occupied for an initial eight-year term with options for renewal.

The towers are an example of brutalist architecture, and are constructed mainly out of concrete and granite. The architecture of DBS Tower One, together with that of buildings such as the Singapore Land Tower, Temasek Tower and OCBC Centre, dominates the architecture of Singapore. In 2017, Tower One's original aluminium-cladded façade was replaced with a new glass curtain wall façade. It has the world's largest rear projection smart glass display on 400 sqm of switchable glass.

See also 
 List of tallest buildings in Singapore

References

External links 

Office buildings completed in 1975
DBS Bank
Downtown Core (Singapore)
Skyscraper office buildings in Singapore
Raffles Place
Twin towers
1975 establishments in Singapore
Brutalist architecture in Singapore
20th-century architecture in Singapore